Glen River may refer to:

Glen River (Chaudière River tributary), Quebec, Canada
River Glen, Lincolnshire, England
River Glen, Northumberland, England
Glen River, County Donegal, Ireland
Glen River, County Down, Northern Ireland
Glen Water, Ayrshire, Scotland

See also
 Glen (disambiguation)